The 3rd Armored Division (also known as "Spearhead", 3rd Armored, and 3AD) was an armored division of the United States Army. Unofficially nicknamed the "Third Herd," the division was first activated in 1941 and was active in the European Theater of World War II. The division was stationed in West Germany for much of the Cold War and also participated in the Persian Gulf War. On 17 January 1992, still in Germany, the division ceased operations. In October 1992, it was formally inactivated as part of a general drawing down of U.S. military forces at the end of the Cold War.

World War II

Composition 
The 3rd Armored Division was organized as a "heavy" armored division, as was its counterpart, the 2nd Armored Division ("Hell on Wheels"). Later on in World War II, higher-numbered U.S. armored divisions were made smaller, with a higher ratio of armored infantry to tanks, based on lessons learned from fighting in North Africa.

As a "heavy" division, the 3rd Armored commanded two armored regiments containing a total of four medium tank battalions and two light tank battalions (18 companies) instead of the usual three tank battalions containing both light and heavy tanks (12 companies). The division commanded 232 medium tanks, compared to the 168 allotted to a standard light armored division, and commanded attached units numbering over 16,000 men in place of the usual 12,000 found in the light armored divisions. The 3rd Armored also commanded three armored infantry battalions.

The division's core units were the 36th Armored Infantry Regiment, the 32nd Armored Regiment, the 33rd Armor Regiment, the 23rd Armored Engineer Battalion, the 83rd Armored Reconnaissance Battalion, and the 143rd Armored Signal Company. During World War II, these units were organized into task forces known as combat commands A, B and R (Reserve).

In addition to the core units, a number of other units of various specialties were attached to the division during various operations.

The division was composed of the following units:

 Headquarters Company
 Service Company
 Combat Command A
 Combat Command B
 32nd Armored Regiment
 33rd Armored Regiment
 36th Armored Infantry Regiment
 83rd Armored Reconnaissance Battalion
 23rd Armored Engineer Battalion
 143rd Armored Signal Company
 3rd Armored Division Artillery
 54th Armored Field Artillery Battalion
 67th Armored Field Artillery Battalion
 391st Armored Field Artillery Battalion
 3rd Armored Division Trains
 3rd Ordnance Maintenance Battalion
 Supply Battalion
 45th Armored Medical Battalion
 Military Police Platoon

Attached units included:
 643rd Tank Destroyer Battalion (attached 22 to 26 December 1944)
644th Tank Destroyer Battalion
 703rd Tank Destroyer Battalion (attached 25 June 1944 to 17 December 1944; 2 January 1945 to 9 May 1945)
 803rd Tank Destroyer Battalion (attached 25 June 1944 to 2 July 1944)
 413th AAA Gun Battalion (attached 7 July 1944 to 16 July 1944)
 486th AAA Auto-Weapons Battalion (attached 25 June 1944 to 9 May 1945)

Training timeline

The 3rd Armored was activated on 15 April 1941 at Camp Beauregard, LA. In June 1941, it moved to Camp Polk, Louisiana (now Fort Polk). On 9 March 1942, it came under the jurisdiction of the Army Ground Forces and was assigned to the II Armored Corps. In July 1942 it was transferred to Camp Young, CA and from August to October 1942, took part in maneuvers at the Desert Training Center there. It left Camp Young in January 1943 and moved to the Indiantown Gap Military Reservation in Pennsylvania.

The division arrived in the European Theatre on 15 September 1943, conducting pre-invasion training near Liverpool and Bristol in Great Britain. It remained in Somerset, England until 24 June 1944, when it departed to partake in the Normandy operations.

Combat service
The first elements of the 3rd Armored saw combat on 29 June in France, with the division as a whole beginning combat operations on 9 July 1944. During this time, it was under the command of VII Corps and XVIII Airborne Corps First Army, but was later reassigned to the XIX Corps under the Ninth Army and the for the rest of the war.

The division was the "spearhead" of the First Army through the Normandy Campaign, taking part in a number of engagements, most notably in the Battle of Saint-Lô, where it suffered significant casualties. After facing heavy fighting in the hedgerows and developing methods to overcome the vast thickets of brush and earth that constrained its mobility, the unit broke out at Marigny alongside the 1st Infantry Division and swung south to Mayenne. 3rd AD engineers and maintenance crews solved the problem of the Norman hedgerows by taking the large I-Beam invasion barriers from the beaches at Normandy and welding them on the fronts of Sherman tanks as large crossing rams. They would then hit the hedgerows at high speed, bursting through them without exposing the vulnerable underbellies of the tanks.

The division was next ordered to help close the Argentan-Falaise Pocket containing the German Seventh Army, which it finished by 18 August near Putanges. Six days later, the outfit had sped through Courville and Chartres and was approaching the banks of the Seine River. On the night of 25 August 1944, the division began the crossing of the Seine; once completed, the 3rd moved across France, reaching the Belgian border on 2 September 1944.

Liberated in the path of the division were Meaux, Soissons, Laon, Marle, Mons, Charleroi, Namur and Liège. The division cut off 40,000 Wehrmacht troops at Mons and captured 8,000 prisoners.

Hurtgen and the Bulge
On 10 September 1944, the 3rd, now nicknamed the "Spearhead Division", fired what it claimed was the first American field artillery shell onto German soil of the war. Two days later, it passed the German border and soon breached the Siegfried Line after taking part in the Battle of Hürtgen Forest.

The 3rd Armored Division fought far north of the deepest German penetration during the Battle of the Bulge. The division worked its way south in an attack designed to help wipe out the bulge and bring First Army's line abreast of General George S. Patton's Third Army, which was fighting northward toward Houffalize. It severed a vital highway leading to St. Vith and later reached Lierneux, Belgium, where it halted to refit.

Into the German heartland
After a month of rest, the division resumed its offensive to the east, and on 26 February, rolled back inside Germany. In the following weeks, the 3rd bolted across the Roer River and seized several towns, crossed the Erft, and at last broke through to the Rhine River to capture Cologne by 7 March. During the engagement in Cologne, a spectacular film was shot of a 3rd Division T-26E Pershing ("Eagle 7") defeating a German PzKPfW V "Panther" that caught the Pershing by surprise in the city streets on 6 March.  Two weeks later, it crossed the Rhine at Honnef, a town south of Cologne.

On 31 March, the commander of the division, Major General Maurice Rose, rounded a corner in his jeep and found himself face to face with a German tank. As he withdrew his pistol either to throw it to the ground or in an attempt to fight back, the young German tank commander, apparently misunderstanding Rose's intentions, shot and killed the general.

After Cologne, the division swept up Paderborn in its advance to shut the back door to the Ruhr Pocket. In April, the division crossed the Saale River north of Halle and sped on toward the Elbe River.

On 11 April 1945, the 3rd Armored discovered the Dora-Mittelbau concentration camp. The division was the first to arrive on the scene, reporting back to headquarters that it had uncovered a large concentration camp near the town of Nordhausen. With help from the 104th Infantry Division, the 3rd immediately began transporting some 250 prisoners to nearby hospitals.

The division's last major fighting in the war was the Battle of Dessau, which the division captured on 23 April 1945 after three days of combat. Following the action at Dessau, the division moved into corps reserve at Sangerhausen. Occupational duty near Langen was given to the division following V-E Day, a role it filled until inactivation on 10 November 1945.

Casualties 
The 3rd Armored Division suffered the following casualties:
Total battle casualties: 9,243
Killed in action: 1,810
Wounded in action: 6,963
Missing in action: 104
Prisoner of war: 366

Enemy casualties 
The division inflicted the following enemy casualties:
 Combat vehicles destroyed: 6,751

 Prisoners of war: 76,720

Individual awards
Members of the division received the following awards:
Distinguished Service Crosses – 17
Legions of Merit – 23
Silver Stars – 885
Soldiers Medal – 32
Bronze Stars – 3,884
Purple Hearts – in excess of 10,500
Air Medals – 138
Distinguished Flying Crosses – 3

Cold War

The division was reactivated on 15 July 1947 at Fort Knox, Kentucky as a training formation. In 1955, the 3rd Armored Division was reorganized for combat and was shipped to Germany the next year. It replaced the 4th Infantry Division under a program called Operation Gyroscope. It was the first U.S. armored division to be stationed east of the Rhine in the Cold War. The division, headquartered at Frankfurt am Main, served in Cold War Germany for approximately 36 years, from May 1956 to July 1992, with the exception of time spent in Saudi Arabia and Iraq during the leadup to and fighting of the Gulf War. The three main combat forces headquarters for the 3rd AD were (1) Ayers Kaserne at Kirch-Goens and Schloss Kaserne at Butzbach (The forces at these Kasernes initially formed Combat Command "A" [CCA] of the 3rd Armored Division), (2) Coleman Kaserne at Gelnhausen (CCB/2d Brigade); and (3) Ray Barracks at Friedberg (CCC/3rd Brigade).

The most famous soldier in the division during the 1950s was Elvis Presley, who was assigned to the 1st Medium Tank Battalion, 32d Armor, at Ray Barracks. After his time in service, Presley made a movie called G.I. Blues in which he portrays a 3rd Armored Division tank crewman with little field duty but with much opportunity for singing, particularly at Frankfurt. In real life Presley was promoted to sergeant near the end of his tour in Germany without the prospect of attending the 3d Armored Division Non Commissioned Officer Academy. In the movie he wears the insignia of a specialist five rather than sergeant's stripes.

Colin Powell also served in the division. He was assigned to the 2nd Armored Rifle Battalion, 48th Infantry, Combat Command B, Coleman Kaserne, Gelnhausen, between 1958 and 1960. His first Army command assignment was infantry platoon leader. The 3rd Armored's primary mission between May 1956 to July 1992 was, in the event of war, to defend the Fulda Gap alongside other NATO elements against numerically superior Warsaw Pact forces. USAREUR maxed out its Cold War troop strength in June of 1962; that number was never achieved again. Also in June 1962, the nuclear warheads for U.S. Davy Crockett devices arrived in Europe (3rd AD combat maneuver battalions were issued Davy Crocketts). In late October 1962, during the Cuban Missile Crisis, Soviet Forces, including those in the Group of Soviet Forces in Germany (GSFG), were placed on the highest alert level, as there was no way to communicate between Washington and Moscow. Two of the five armies in the GSFG were positioned to advance through the Fulda Gap – the 8th Guards Army, containing three motor rifle divisions and one tank division, and 1st Guards Tank Army, containing four tank divisions and one motor rifle division. From 1963 onwards, Reorganization Objective Army Division (ROAD) changes meant organizational changes within the 3rd AD's three combat commands and a name changeover to "brigades" (e.g. Combat Command A became 1st Brigade).

To prepare their soldiers for an invasion, the 3rd Armored Division's units frequently conducted field training, including exercises of live fire, movement and communications, in Bavaria at Hohenfels Training Center, Wildflecken Training Center, and Grafenwöhr Training Center. Throughout its time in Cold War Germany, beginning in mid-1956, the division would also frequently take to the German countryside for training maneuvers, including, beginning in January 1969, what became an annually staged war game called Reforger, which simulated an invasion of Western Europe by Warsaw Pact forces.

Throughout the Cold War, the division headquarters company, the 503rd Administrative Company, 503rd Adjutant General Company, and 503rd MP Company were based at Drake Kaserne, with 143rd Signal Battalion and other support units stationed across the street at Edwards Kaserne in Frankfurt, West Germany. A number of its subunits were based in other Kasernes throughout the German state of Hessen, notably Ayers Kaserne (50° 28' 32.44" N 8° 38' 29.24" E) at Kirch-Goens and Schloss Kaserne at Butzbach (CCA/1st Brigade), Gelnhausen (CCB/2d Brigade), Ray Barracks at Friedberg (CCC/3rd Brigade) and Fliegerhorst near Hanau (eventually converted to the division's Aviation Brigade base). The NCO Academy contained two companies: Co. A was assigned to the medieval castle at Usingen-Kransberg, while Co. B was located in Butzbach. The division itself was of comprised an average of 15,000 soldiers organized into three combat commands (CCs) of comparable sizes to the World War II combat commands. These brigades were manned by at least one battalion each of infantry, armor, and artillery, and various supporting units, including medical, engineer, and aviation elements.

The division was also assigned the dedicated 533rd Military Intelligence/CEWI (Combat Electronic Warfare and Intelligence) Battalion by 1980, replacing the 503rd MI Company that previously supported the division intelligence staff.

Most of the kasernes were located adjacent to or within German communities, leading to lively trade and interaction between soldiers and German civilians. A few, however, were somewhat remotely located, particularly Ayers Kaserne ("The Rock")(50° 28' 32.44" N 8° 38' 29.24" E) outside Kirch-Goens, where the 1st Brigade was stationed.  As communism in eastern Europe collapsed in the late 1980s, the two German states reunited, and the Soviet Army was beginning to withdraw back to the Soviet Union. With these events, the Cold War came to a peaceful conclusion, freeing U.S. Army units in Europe for other deployments.

Throughout the summer of 1990, in response to the winding down of the Cold War, 3AD was instructed to begin selective standing down of various division elements. Some units, for example the 3rd Battalion, 5th Air Defense Artillery, were turning in equipment and cross-leveling with other 3AD units when momentous events in the Middle East developed in August 1990. That month, Iraq invaded Kuwait, and soon after, President George H. W. Bush committed U.S. troops to the theater, first to defend Saudi Arabia, and then to eject Iraqi troops from Kuwait. Deployment of advance elements of 3AD began in December, with the remaining deploying units arriving by January. Units that had drawn down were replaced or augmented back to full strength. As an example, 3–5 ADA was replaced by the 8th Infantry Division's 5th Battalion, 3rd Air Defense Artillery. Other units were attached to 3AD to bring it up to, and even beyond, full strength.

Deployment and retraining

The 3rd Armored Division, then commanded by Major General Paul Funk, was one of four U.S. heavy divisions deployed with VII Corps to the Gulf Region. The division and its equipment were shifted from Germany to Saudi Arabia, with Army National Guard and Army Reserve elements taking over some of their duties in Germany, while in others, kasernes were left virtually empty. This massive deployment was made possible by the end of the Cold War.

After deployment, the division acclimated to the desert climate, and its troops faced new challenges in mobility, tactics and maintenance in a sandy and hot climate. Various National Guard and Army Reserve units were attached to the division for the duration of the conflict, swelling the division's size to over 20,000 troops – 25% larger than during its time in Germany.

The majority of the division's troops never received Desert Battle Dress Uniforms due to equipment shortages, and fought instead in lightweight summer "woodland pattern" uniforms covered by tanker suits or chemical warfare protective MOPP suits.

Deployment order of battle

For Desert Storm, the division consisted of:
 1st Brigade:
 Headquarters and Headquarters Company (HHC), 1st Brigade
 4th Battalion, 32d Armor
 4th Battalion, 34th Armor (from 8th ID (M))
 3d Battalion, 5th Cavalry
 5th Battalion, 5th Cavalry
2d Battalion, 3d Field Artillery
2d Battalion, 29th Field Artillery (from 8th ID (M))
Battery A, 5th Battalion, 3d Air Defense Artillery (from 8th ID (M))
12th Engineer Battalion (from 8th ID (M))
503d Support Battalion
 2d Brigade:
 HHC, 2d Brigade
 3d Battalion, 8th Cavalry
 4th Battalion, 8th Cavalry
 4th Battalion, 18th Infantry
 3d Brigade:
 HHC, 3d Brigade
 2d Battalion, 67th Armor
 4th Battalion, 67th Armor
 5th Battalion, 18th Infantry
 Aviation Brigade:
 HHC, Aviation Brigade
 4th Squadron, 7th Cavalry
 2d Battalion, 227th Aviation (augmented with Co A, 5–229th AVN just before ground war began)
 3d Battalion, 227th Aviation (detached and assigned to XVIII Airborne Corps prior to 3AD deployment)
 9th Battalion, 227th Aviation
 Task Force Viper
 Division Artillery (DIVARTY):
 Headquarters and Headquarters Battery (HHB), DIVARTY
 Battery A, 40th Field Artillery
 Battery F, 333rd Field Artillery
 2d Battalion, 3rd Field Artillery
 2d Battalion, 82nd Field Artillery
 4th Battalion, 82nd Field Artillery
 Division Support Command (DISCOM):
 HHC, DISCOM
 22d Chemical Company
 503d Forward Support Battalion
 54th Forward Support Battalion
 45th Forward Support Battalion
 122d Main Support Battalion
 Division Troops:
 HHC, 3d Armored Division
 3d Armored Division Band
 503d Military Police Company
 23d Engineer Battalion
 143d Signal Battalion
 533d Military Intelligence Battalion (CEWI)
 Note: 3d Battalion, 5th Air Defense Artillery had inactivated and did not deploy to Desert Shield/Storm
 Attached Units:
 4th Battalion, 34th Armor (from 8th ID (M))
 5th Battalion, 3d Air Defense Artillery (from 8th ID (M))
 3rd Battalion, 20th Field Artillery
2d Battalion, 29th Field Artillery (from 8th ID (M))
12th Engineer Battalion (from 8th ID (M))
 302d RAOC
 323d Chemical Company
 148th Public Affairs Detachment, IDARNG
 369th Personnel Service Company
 Company C, 17th Signal Battalion
 43d Ordnance Detachment (EOD)

Into battle
After months of training, the division moved to the line of departure, with the 1st Armored Division on its left flank and the 2nd Armored Cavalry Regiment on its right flank. While the Iraqi Army concentrated much of its defenses in and around Kuwait itself, the 3rd AD and VII Corps launched a massive armored attack into Iraq, just to the west of Kuwait, taking the Iraqis completely by surprise. 

Scouts from 2nd Brigade crossed the border on the afternoon of 23 February 1991 just after 1500 hours. Less than two hours later, they had penetrated several miles into Iraq and managed to capture over 200 prisoners. On 24 February, the official first day of action, the division as a whole swung into action as part of a coordinated attack by hundreds of thousands of Coalition troops. By dawn on the second day, an additional 50 prisoners had been taken, with scouts reporting enemy reinforcements moving to meet the division.

Second day
At 1115 hours on the second day of the invasion, all elements of the division finally moved across the line of departure. The day was marked by hard pushing to penetrate deep and fast for an objective south of Basra. In the course of its drive, various elements of 3AD engaged the enemy, taking prisoners, skirmishing, sometimes bypassing enemy strongholds to gain ground, and other times engaging in full-scale battle. 

By nightfall of the second day, 3AD had driven 53 miles into Iraq, with dozens of enemy vehicles destroyed, hundreds of POWs captured, and was on the verge of achieving its first objective – an accomplishment that war planners had not anticipated.

Third day
On the third day of combat, 26 February, the division closed in on its objective and faced for the first time the Iraqi Republican Guard, a much stronger foe than the conscripts the division had first engaged, and less inclined to retreat or surrender. Opposing forces included the highly touted Republican Guard "Tawakalna" Division, the Iraqi 52nd Armored Division and elements of the 17th and the 10th Armored Divisions. The division engaged in full scale tank battles for the first time since World War II, with one of the division's veterans stating "there was more than enough action for everyone".

Action continued after nightfall, and by 1840 hours, the ground and air elements of the 3rd AD reported over 20 tanks, 14 APCs, several trucks and some artillery pieces destroyed. Unfortunately, that same evening, the 4th Battalion, 32nd Armor lost the division's first casualties, with two soldiers killed and three wounded to 25mm cannon fire and the Bradley Fighting Vehicle they were in destroyed. During the night, both darkness and sandstorms hampered soldiers' visibility, but thermal sighting systems onboard the M1A1 Abrams tanks and Bradleys allowed gunners to continue to knock out Iraqi targets.

Fourth and fifth days
By the fourth day, the division had reached its objective and was pursuing its now retreating enemy. The division turned east into Kuwait, continuing to inflict heavy casualties and capture troops as it rolled forward, often hitting Iraqi units whose defensive berms and foxholes faced south from their northern flank, rendering their defenses ineffective. By nightfall, forces facing 3AD had been virtually eliminated, with their remnants in full retreat.

By the fifth day of combat, 28 February, the division had achieved all of its original objectives. It had cleared Objective Dorset after meeting stiff resistance and destroying more than 300 enemy vehicles. The 3rd Brigade, 3AD had also captured 2,500 enemy prisoners. The division was now pushing east to block the Iraqi retreat from Kuwait and conduct mopping up operations. Less than one hundred hours after the ground campaign started, President Bush declared a ceasefire.

Gulf War legacy

At the height of the war, the 3rd Armored Division commanded 32 battalions and 20,533 personnel. The 3rd Armored Division was the largest coalition division in the Gulf War and the largest U.S. armored division in history. In its arsenal were 360 Abrams main battle tanks, 340 Bradley Fighting Vehicles, 128 self-propelled 155 mm howitzers, 27 Apache attack helicopters, 9 multiple-launch rocket systems, and additional equipment.

The 3rd AD served at the Battle of 73 Easting and the Battle of Norfolk. Only three of its M1A1 Abrams tanks were damaged during combat operations. The 3rd Armored Division suffered 15 soldiers killed between December 1990 and late February 1991. Seven soldiers were killed in action and another 27 were wounded during combat operations.

In 1991, Division Historian Dan Peterson, comparing the performance of the division in World War II and Desert Storm, stated, "History does always repeat itself. 3rd Armored Division was the Spearhead in both wars."

Following the war, 3rd Armored Division was one of the first units rotated to Camp Doha, Kuwait, providing protection to Kuwait as the country was rebuilt.

Inactivation
Following Desert Storm, a number of the division's units were transferred to the 1st Armored Division.

On 17 January 1992, the 3rd Armored Division officially ceased operations in Germany with a ceremony held in Frankfurt at Division Headquarters Drake Kaserne.

"Sir, this is my final salute. Mission accomplished," said Maj. Gen. Jerry Rutherford, the division commander. Rutherford preceded the final salute to General Crosbie E. Saint, USAREUR Commander, with a loudly shouted "Spearhead!". The division colors were then returned to the United States with the 3rd AD still officially active, since Army regulations state that a Divisional "Casing of the Colors" cannot occur on foreign soil.

Official Inactivation took place at Fort Knox, on 17 October 1992. In attendance at the ceremony were several former Spearhead commanding generals and division veterans from all eras. In a traditional ceremony, Command Sgt. Major Richard L. Ross, holding the division color with battle streamers, passed it to General Frederick M. Franks, Jr., completing the official inactivation of the division. With this ceremony, the 3rd Armored Division was removed from the active duty force structure of the U.S. Army.

Reassignment
With the end of the Cold War, several of the division's overseas Kasernes were transferred to other units, particularly the 1st Armored Division. Over time, many were closed, fell into disrepair, or were demolished. Some 3rd Armored units were transferred to the 1st Armored, notably the 2nd Battalion, 3rd Field Artillery, later to become semi-famous as the unit portrayed in Gunner Palace.

The 1st Battalion, 32nd Armor was reflagged and is now stationed at Fort Campbell, Kentucky as part of the 101st Airborne Division (Air Assault). The unit was reorganized as the 1st Squadron, 32nd Cavalry Regiment, and is assigned to the 1st Brigade Combat Team of the 101st Airborne Division (Air Assault) as its organic Reconnaissance, Surveillance, and Target Acquisition (RSTA) element. The 1st Battalion, 33rd Armor was also reflagged and stationed at Fort Campbell with the 101st Airborne Division (Air Assault) as the 1st Squadron, 33rd Cavalry Regiment, and is assigned to the Division's 3rd Brigade Combat Team. The 4th Squadron, 7th Cavalry later became part of 1st Brigade, 2nd Infantry Division. It was inactivated on 2 July 2015.

The following 3AD units were assigned to the 1st Cavalry Division:

1st Battalion, 5th Cavalry
2nd Battalion, 5th Cavalry
3rd Battalion, 8th Cavalry
2nd Battalion, 82nd Field Artillery
2nd Battalion, 227th Aviation
3rd Battalion, 227th Aviation

Additionally, the 122nd Support Battalion (Main) from the Division Support Command was reactivated at Fort Bragg and assigned to the Combat Aviation Brigade, 82nd Airborne Division as the 122nd Support Battalion (Aviation). The 54th Support Battalion (Main) was reactivated on 16 September 1994 as the 54th Support Battalion (Base) of the 80th Support Group (Area).

Commanders
The 3rd Armored Division had thirty-nine commanders over the course of its history, many of whom went on to obtain four star rank.

In popular culture
Books, movies and other media that feature the Third Armored Division include:

The Tanks Are Coming (1951) – A typical World War II action movie of the time, based loosely on actual events
 G.I. Blues (1960) – Elvis Presley, a real life 3AD veteran who served as a Scout/Recon (rode in a jeep), stars as a 3rd AD Tanker with an off-post singing career and dreams of owning a nightclub
 A unique look at the war from a maintenance officer's perspective.
 Rolling Thunder: The True Story of the Third Armored Division (2002) – A History Channel documentary detailing the history of the division from birth to the 1990s.
 Man, Moment, Machine (season 1, episode 4): "Stormin' Norman and the Abrams Tank" – Featuring footage of the 3rd AD in the Gulf War, and interviews with 3AD tankers.
The Walk (The X-Files) – In the seventh episode of the third season, General Thomas Callahan (played by Thomas Kopache) wears the insignia of the 3rd AD on his Class A uniform.
Spearhead (Makos novel) – a war biography by the author Adam Makos. Published on 19 February 2019.

References

Further reading
Trauschweizer, Ingo. (2008). The Cold War U.S. Army: Building Deterrence for Limited War. Univ. Press of Kansas. .
Carter, Donald A. (2015). Forging the Shield: The U.S. Army in Europe, 1951–1962. U.S. Army Center of Military History.

External links

3AD.com – The 3rd Armored Division History Foundation – Covering 1941 to 1992 with high-quality photos, feature articles, documents, audio, and more. Includes, for example, complete text of the 260-page 3AD World War II history  "Spearhead in the West", audio of President Kennedy's speech to the troops in 1963, details on 3AD Cold War nuclear weapons, Spearhead Newspaper's Gulf War reports, and a look at Elvis Presley's Army days.
Veterans of the Battle of the Bulge
Association of 3rd Armored Division Veterans  (All-era group) Extensive historical information, personal photos, and a roster of Operation Desert Storm troops.
3rd Armored Division Association Archives at the University of Illinois.  Text-only listings of their large World War II collection, which must be visited in person.
3rd AD Unit page on Military.com. 
Roll of Honor of the 3rd Armored Division during WWII.
Bureau of Land Management site on 3rd AD training area in Mojave Desert 
3rd Armor Division Profile  in Order of Battle of the United States Army World War II , 1945 reproduced at United States Army Center of Military History
GlobalSecurity.org 3rd Armored Division site
United States Holocaust Historical Museum site, featuring an overview of the liberation of the Nordhausen concentration camp by the 3rd AD, including videos and photos.
USAREUR Charts, includes information on 1977 Restationing of 3AD units.
Operations Desert Shield and Desert Storm: Valorous Unit Award Citations

Armored divisions of the United States Army
Armored Division, U.S. 03
Military units and formations established in 1941
Military units and formations disestablished in 1992
Military units and formations of the United States in the Cold War
Military units and formations of the United States in the Gulf War